Pan Am Flight 115 was a commercial flight from Paris via London to New York City. At 22:05 GMT (16:05 EDT) on February 3, 1959 it was involved in one of the most notable jet upset incidents of the jet airliner age, over the North Atlantic near Newfoundland. This was one of three notable aviation incidents to occur on this date; the other two were the crash of American Airlines Flight 320 in New York City, and the death of rock and roll artists Buddy Holly, Ritchie Valens, and "The Big Bopper" J.P. Richardson.

Aircraft
The aircraft was a Boeing 707-121 with registration N712PA, nicknamed "Clipper Washington". Its first flight was on October 13, 1958 (the same month that 707s entered regular service with Pan Am), and when the incident occurred less than four months later, the aircraft had accumulated only 705 total flight hours.

Incident

With the autopilot engaged, the captain left the cockpit and entered the main cabin. During his absence, the autopilot disengaged and the aircraft smoothly and slowly entered a steep descending spiral. The copilot was not properly monitoring the aircraft's instruments or the progress of the flight and was unaware of the actions of the aircraft until considerable speed had been gained and altitude lost. During the rapid descent the copilot was unable to effect recovery.

Investigation
During the previous two flights the Bendix PB-20 autopilot was reported in one case to have caused a nose-down pitch and in another to have disconnected following a change of heading of 20 degrees, but on February 3 operation was found to be normal on arrival at Gander. The disengagement warning light was fully dimmed.

Reports
Flight magazine's issue of 3 April 1959 reported, "Captain Waldo Lynch, the pilot-in-command, said that the aircraft went into a sharp manoeuvre downward and to the right. At  the airspeed was over 400 kt, the electric trim button was inoperative, and his gyro horizon had tumbled. The copilot recounted that "At 2200Z the navigator posted a change in heading requiring left turn. Used autopilot turn knob. Turn O.K. . . . Then light buffeting, plus positive load factor building up. . . . Heavy buffeting caused panel lights to fail."

The flight engineer said that he was pinned to his seat as the Mach warning sounded. When the g load was relieved,
he pulled the tailplane-power and autopilot circuit-breakers because he thought that the tailplane had "run away." Full nosedown
tailplane inclination of 3 degrees was indicated. He wound it back to the nose-up position but later trimmed nose-down.

Aviation Safety Network reports the cause of the incident as unintentional disconnection of autopilot while the captain had left the cockpit to enter the passenger cabin. The copilot did not pay sufficient attention to the instruments and the plane went into a dive in a clockwise spiraling turn.

Later history of the aircraft
After being operated by a number of firms, the airframe was eventually scrapped in August 1984, at Taipei, Taiwan.

References and notes

External links
 Aircraft Accident report Civil Aeronautics Board
115

1959 in Canada
Aviation accidents and incidents in Canada
Disasters in Newfoundland and Labrador
Aviation accidents and incidents in 1959
Accidents and incidents involving the Boeing 707
1959 in Newfoundland and Labrador